Ergocarpon is a genus of flowering plants belonging to the family Apiaceae.

Its native range is northern Iraq to northwestern Iran.

Species:
 Ergocarpon cryptanthum (Rech.f.) C.C.Towns.

References

Apiaceae
Apiaceae genera